, also known as  for short, with the tagline "I wanna say that I'm not your brother right now!", is a Japanese visual novel developed by Fairys, a sister brand of Sprite, the creators of Love, Elections & Chocolate. It was released on December 14, 2012 playable on Windows PCs and is rated all ages. The game takes place before the events of Love, Elections & Chocolate, and features two of the heroines from that game: Chisato Sumiyoshi and Satsuki Shinonome. The story revolves around the protagonist Rikuto Mitani, whose father remarried a woman who already has a daughter. There is a manga adaptation of the game published in Dengeki Daioh. Imaimo and Love, Elections & Chocolate were both featured at the 2012 Anime Contents Expo. A PlayStation Vita version was released in Japan on 24 April 2014.

Characters

Year 1 Class 8

She is the homeroom teacher in charge of Year 1 Class 8 at Asaoka Academy.

 She is Rikuto's classmate and Class 8's chairman as of chapter 6 in the manga. She is a timid and quiet girl. The first time spoke loud and clearly is in chapter 16 in the manga. She attends the same class as Rikuto. She was originally a supporting character.

 He is the protagonist who attends Asaoka Academy as a first year. He is Class 8's vice chairman as of chapter 6 in the manga. He fell in love with Ayumu in her female form without knowing who she is. Rikuto had his doubts when it comes to knowing Ayumu's true gender, so it wasn't until chapter 11 that his thoughts were confirmed. At first, he didn't accept having a new family but then he gradually accepted them. He didn't call Ryouko "mom" because he thinks he need just one mom. He would not let Ryouko cook his favorite meal, oyakodon, because that is what his deceased mother used to make. He eventually let Ryouko cook him some oyakodon. He finally calls Ryouko "mom" in chapter 16 of the manga. He crushed Ryuugo at soccer in middle school when he was ace. Since then, Ryuugo tried to get him to join the soccer club, although Rikuto said it was a one time coincidence. He carries a wristwatch but because it is for girls, he carries it on his belt (It is a memento from his deceased mother.). After what happened to his father, he swore never to forgive anyone who would steal someone else's happiness. He and Ayumu finally confessed their feelings for one another, not as brother and sister, but as boy and girl. Then they became a couple. He does not remember but he met Ayumu when they were only three years old.

Year 1 Class 8's Event Executive Committee

 She is Rikuto's step-sister. Due to her mother, she always dresses like a boy at home. When she is at school, she wears a female uniform. She attends the same class as Rikuto. When she was younger, she always wanted a kind older brother. When she sleeps, she dreams of a kind older brother spoiling her. That was her first love. She and Rikuto finally confessed their feelings for one another, not as brother and sister, but as boy and girl. Then they became a couple. She doesn't remember but she met Rikuto when they were only three years old. The older brother in her dream is actually Rikuto.

 Nanase has been Rikuto's "ally" since they were in middle school. She attends the same class as Rikuto. She knows Ayumu's real gender. She is very popular amongst boys and gets confessed to a lot, even though she rejects them just as much.

 Due to her grandfather, she wears a male uniform at school, and because of this, she is popular among the female students. She even wears male underwear. She attends the same class as Rikuto. She likes cute things.

He is Rikuto's classmate. He likes to act like a gentleman.

Supporting characters

He is Rikuto's father. He only lets Ryouko call him Nao-tan. He works as a chief at a store he owns. Rikuto and his friends sometimes visit. Because he can't wear a ring at work, he wears a wristwatch, same one Ikumi wore, instead. He took off his "ring" in chapter 14, saying that he has moved on and Rikuto should too. When Rikuto was very young, he let an old friend take care of the expenses in the "new" store. Then he lost contact with his friend and never saw him since. With most of the money gone, he couldn't pay for Ikumi's surgery that she really needed and died.

She is Rikuto's deceased mother. She died when he was very young. Rikuto has her wristwatch, which was used as a wedding ring.
 (Maiden Name Tsunoda)

She is Ayumu's mother. She is a 35-year-old professional make-up artist who looks ten years younger.

She is a 12-year-old girl who lives next door to the Mitani family's apartment.

He is the sophomore of Asaoka Academy and the ace striker of soccer club. He and Rikuto were senior and junior since middle school.

She is Ayumu's cousin. She is originally from Love, Elections & Chocolate.

She is Matsuri's childhood friend. She is originally from Love, Elections & Chocolate.

He is Mao's father.

Development
In an interview with ASCII Media Works, the game's producer Akira Sakamoto said that there had been requests from "young users" for all ages games, so Imaimo was made to respond to that "new challenge". He also said that the game's title is meant to express the feelings of the heroine in the second half of the story. The character designer and artist is Yū Akinashi, the music is by Elements Garden, the music producer Shigeru Saitō, and the script is by Kō Katagi.

Reception
The PlayStation Vita version of the game received a total score of 27/40 by Famitsu. It was the 574th best selling video game of the year in Japan in 2014, with 6,068 units sold.

References

External links
Official website  

2012 manga
2012 video games
ASCII Media Works manga
Bishōjo games
Dengeki Daioh
Japan-exclusive video games
PlayStation Vita games
Romance anime and manga
Romance video games
School life in anime and manga
Shōnen manga
Video games developed in Japan
Visual novels
Windows games